The 2011 Tendring District Council election for the Tendring District Council was held in 2011 as part of the wider local elections.

Election results

Ward results

Alresford

Alton Park

Ardleigh and Little Bromley

Beaumont and Thorpe

Bockings Elm

Bradfield, Wrabness & Wix

Brightlingsea

Burrsville

Frinton

Golf Green

Great & Little Oakley

Great Bentley

Hamford

Harwich East

Harwich East Central

Harwich West

Harwich West Central

Haven

Holland and Kirby

Homelands

Lawford

Little Clacton and Weeley

Manningtree, Mistley, Little Bentley and Tendring

Peter Bruff

Pier

Ramsey and Parkeston

Rush Green

St. Bartholomews

St. James

St. John's

St. Mary's

St. Osyth and Point Clear

St. Paul's

Thorrington, Frating, Elmstead and Great Bromley

Walton

2011
2011 English local elections